Rajin University of Marine Transport is a North Korean technical university founded in July 1968 in Rason. It trains technicians, specialists and management officials in the field of marine transport.

Noted alumni 

 Kim Yong-il, former premier of North Korea

See also 

 List of universities in North Korea
 North Korea Maritime Administration

References 

 
  “The new Aquaman of China is a North Korean refugee” 

Universities in North Korea
1968 establishments in North Korea
Buildings and structures in Rason